The Esquimalt First Nation, also known as the Esquimalt Indian Band and Esquimalt Nation, is a First Nations band government of the Esquimalt people.  Historically their village was located closer to Victoria proper, but today their main reserve is on the north shore of Esquimalt Harbour adjacent to the Town of View Royal.  They are a member nation of the First Nations of South Island Tribal Council, and were signatories to the Douglas Treaties.

References

Greater Victoria
Coast Salish governments